Francesco Maria I della Rovere (25 March 1490 – 20 October 1538) was an Italian condottiero, who was Duke of Urbino from 1508 to 1516 and, after retaking the throne from Lorenzo II de' Medici, from 1521 to 1538.

Biography 

He was born in Senigallia, the son of the Papal captain and lord of that city, Giovanni della Rovere, and of Giovanna da Montefeltro, daughter of Federico III da Montefeltro. He was also the nephew of Giuliano della Rovere, Pope Julius II.

His uncle Guidobaldo I of Urbino, who was heirless, called him at his court, and named him as heir of that dukedom in 1504 through the intercession of Julius II. In 1502 the della Rovere had lost the seigniory of Senigallia, occupied by Cesare Borgia, then the most powerful figure in the Marche: Francesco Maria and his mother were saved from the slaughter perpetrated by Borgia's troops by the then-land soldier Andrea Doria. When in 1508 Guidobaldo died, Francesco Maria became duke of Urbino; thanks to the support of his uncle the pope he could also recover Senigallia after Borgia's death.

In 1508 he married Eleonora Gonzaga (1493–1570), daughter of Francesco II Gonzaga, Marquess of Mantua and Isabella d'Este.

In 1511, after he had failed to conquer Bologna, he had the cardinal Francesco Alidosi killed by his troops, a cruel action for which he was compared to Borgia himself. In 1513 he was created also lord of Pesaro.

However, the death of Julius II deprived him of his main political patron, and under the new pope, Leo X, Pesaro was given to the latter's nephew, Lorenzo II de' Medici. In 1516 he was excommunicated and ousted from Urbino, which he tried unsuccessfully to recover the following year. He could return in his duchy only after Leo's death in 1521.

Della Rovere fought as captain general of the Republic of Venice in Lombardy during the Italian Wars of 1521 (1523–1525), but with the new Medici Pope, Clement VII, the della Rovere were increasingly marginalized. As supreme commander of the Holy League, his inaction against the Imperial invasion troops is generally listed as one of the causes of the Sack of Rome (1527).

He was a protagonist of the capture of Pavia in the late 1520s, and later fought for the Republic of Venice. Later he arranged the marriage of son Guidobaldo to Giulia da Varano (belonging to another former seigniory family of the region) to counter the Papal power in the Marche.

He died in Pesaro, poisoned.  Some scholars suggest that The Murder of Gonzago, an unknown play referenced in William Shakespeare's Hamlet, Prince of Denmark, which is itself later reworked by Hamlet into The Mousetrap (the play within the play), may have been a popular theatrical reenactment of Della Rovere's death and may have been portrayed in England's early theaters during the Elizabethan Era.

Issue
Federico della Rovere (1511 – died aged two months).
Guidobaldo II della Rovere (2 April 1514 – 28 September 1574), married Giulia Varano and had issue; married Vittoria Farnese (daughter of Pier Luigi Farnese, Duke of Parma) had issue (ancestors of Maria Teresa Cybo-Malaspina).
Giovanna della Rovere (1515–1518).
Giovanni della Rovere (1516–1518).
Caterina della Rovere (1518–1520).
Beatrice della Rovere (1521–1522).
Francesco Maria della Rovere (1523–1525).
Ippolita della Rovere (1525–1561), reportedly married Antonio of Aragon, Duke of Montalto.
Maria della Rovere (1527–1528).
Elisabetta della Rovere (1529 – 6 June 1561), married Alberico I Cybo-Malaspina, Marquis of Massa and had issue (ancestors of Maria Teresa Cybo-Malaspina).
Giulia Feltria della Rovere (1531 – 4 April 1563), married Alfonso d'Este, Lord of Montecchio and had issue (were parents of Cesare d'Este, Duke of Modena).
Giulio Feltrio della Rovere (1533–1578), became a cardinal then later had issue (illegitimate):Ippolito and Giulio.
Violante della Rovere (1535–1538).

References

Sources

External links

1490 births
1538 deaths
People from Senigallia
Francesco Maria 1
People excommunicated by the Catholic Church
Francesco Maria 1
Francesco Maria 1
16th-century condottieri
Military leaders of the Italian Wars
Republic of Venice generals
Assassinated Italian people
16th-century Italian nobility
Captains General of the Church